Moshe Yosef is a former Israeli footballer who played in Maccabi Netanya and was a part of the team that won the 1970-71 championship.

Honours
Israeli Premier League (1):
1970-71

References

Living people
Israeli Jews
Israeli footballers
Maccabi Netanya F.C. players
Liga Leumit players
Association footballers not categorized by position
Year of birth missing (living people)